The 1980 NAIA Division II football season, as part of the 1980 college football season in the United States and the 25th season of college football sponsored by the NAIA, was the 11th season of play of the NAIA's lower division for football.

The season was played from August to November 1980 and culminated in the 1980 NAIA Division II Football National Championship, played at the Lincoln Bowl in Tacoma, Washington.

Pacific Lutheran defeated Wilmington (OH) in the championship game, 38–10, to win their first NAIA national title.

Conference realignment

Conference changes
 This was the final season for the Tri-State Conference. Its three remaining members, from Iowa and South Dakota, would all become independents.

Conference standings

Conference champions

Postseason

See also
 1980 NAIA Division I football season
 1980 NCAA Division I-A football season
 1980 NCAA Division I-AA football season
 1980 NCAA Division II football season
 1980 NCAA Division III football season

References

 
NAIA Football National Championship